The 2009–10 season was the 104th season in the existence of RC Strasbourg and the club's second and last consecutive season in the second division of French football. In addition to the domestic league, Strasbourg participated in this season's edition of the Coupe de France and the Coupe de la Ligue. The season covered the period from 1 July 2009 to 30 June 2010.

Competitions

Overall record

Ligue 2

League table

Results summary

Results by round

Matches

Coupe de France

Coupe de la Ligue

References

External links
 The season on racingstub.com

RC Strasbourg Alsace seasons
Strasbourg